The National Lacrosse League Sportsmanship Award is given annually to a National Lacrosse League (NLL) player. It "honors the combination of character and performance" shown by a player.

Past winners

References

Footnotes

Sportsmanship
Sportsmanship trophies and awards